Alessandro Cattelan (born 11 May 1980) is an Italian television and radio presenter best known for presenting the Italian edition of Total Request Live, broadcast by MTV Italia, and Le Iene, broadcast by Mediaset's Italia 1. Cattelan also hosted the Italian version of The X Factor from 2011 to 2020.

During the 2018–19 season, Cattelan presented the Italian late show E poi c'è Cattelan (EPCC), on air on Sky Uno. He was also nominated as a possible candidate for the Sanremo Music Festival 2020, as well as being confirmed by RAI as one of the three hosts of the Eurovision Song Contest 2022, alongside Laura Pausini and Mika, after he signed a contract with the national broadcaster.

Cattelan is a devoted fan of football club Inter Milan, and is often present in the stadium and training sessions of the team.

Filmography

Television

References

External links

 
 Official blog
 Alessandro Cattelan on MTV.it

1980 births
Living people
Italian television personalities